Mathare is a collection of slums in Nairobi with a population of approximately 500,000 people; the population of Mathare Valley alone, the oldest of the slums that make up Mathare, is 180,000 people. Mathare is the home of football teams Mathare United and Real Mathare of the MYSA. Mathare is currently part of two electoral constituencies; the titular Mathare Constituency and the northern part being in Ruaraka Constituency. The northern part was initially part of Kasarani Constituency up to the 2013 elections when Kasarani was split into three electoral constituencies; Ruaraka being among them. The southern part was domiciled in Starehe Constituency.

Gang violence
In 2006, Mathare was damaged by violence between rival gangs the Taliban (not to be confused with the Islamist group of the same name), a Luo group, and the Mungiki, a Kikuyu group. Brewers of an illegal alcoholic drink, chang'aa, asked the Taliban for help after the Mungiki tried to raise their taxes on the drink; since then, fighting between the two has led to the burning of hundreds of homes and at least 10 deaths. Police entered the slum on November 7, 2006, and the General Service Unit arrived a day later. However, many residents who fled are still afraid to return.

On June 5, 2007, the Mungiki murdered two police officers in Mathare; the same night, police retaliated by killing 22 people and detaining around 100.

Following the controversial presidential elections that took place on December 27, 2007, gangs of Kikuyu and Luo youth engaged in violent fights and burned more than 100 homes.

See also

Kibera
Kawangware
Kiambiu
Korogocho
Mukuru slums

Further reading
 Rodriguez-Torres, Deyssi. "Public authorities and urban upgrading policies in Eastlands: the example of 'Mathare 4A Slum Upgrading Project." In: Charton-Bigot, Hélène and Deyssi Rodriguez-Torres (editors). Nairobi Today: The Paradox of a Fragmented City. African Books Collective, 2010. p. 61-96. , 9789987080939. The source edition is an English translation, published by Mkuki na Nyota Publishers Ltd.  of Dar es Salaam, Tanzania in association with the French Institute for Research in Africa (IFRA)  The book was originally published in French as Nairobi contemporain: Les paradoxes d'une ville fragmentée, Karthala Editions (Hommes et sociétés, ISSN 0993-4294). French version article: "Les pouvoirs publics et les politiques de reenovation urbaine aa Eastlands L'exemple du « Mathare 4A Slum Upgrading Project »", p. 101-146.
 De Lame, Danielle. "Grey Nairobi: Sketches of Urban Socialities." In: Charton-Bigot, Hélène and Deyssi Rodriguez-Torres (editors). Nairobi Today: The Paradox of a Fragmented City. African Books Collective, 2010. p. 167-214. French version article: "Gris Nairobi: Esquisses de sociabilités urbaines." p. 221-284. , 9782845867871.
 Includes a section on Mathare, titled "Mathare: Valley of Blood and Tears", p. 205-209 (In French: "Mathare: vallée de sang et de larmes", p. 272-277).
"Mathare Valley. A Case Study of Uncontrolled Settlement in Nairobi." University of Nairobi, Housing Research and Development Unit. GITEC Consult (1995).
"Mathare 4A Development Programme Feasibility Study Report." Ministry?
Reback, Andrew. "Slum Upgrading Case Study: Nairobi’s Mathare 4A." September 2007.

References

External links
OneLife Africa-This organization exists to identify and equip at-risk young people in Mathare slums
Mathare Valley Outreach
Mathare Youth Sports Association
Nairobi Slums School Projects Trust
The Mwelu Foundation - Grass-roots youth project centering on photography
Made in the Streets
Mathare-Inn Photobook Fundraising project by photographer Claudio Allia with texts by Claudio Torres.

Populated places in Kenya
Shanty towns in Kenya
Slums in Kenya
Suburbs of Nairobi